Flier or Flyer is a surname. Notable people with the surname include:

Jaap Flier (born 1934), Dutch ballet dancer and choreographer
Jeffrey Scott Flier (born 1948), American physician, endocrinologist, researcher and Dean of the Faculty of Medicine at Harvard University
Manon Flier (born 1984), Dutch volleyball player
Natasha Flyer (born 1969), American earth scientist and applied mathematician
Yakov Flier (1912-1977), Russian concert pianist and teacher

See also
 Van der Flier